USS Grampus (SS-207) was the eighth Tambor-class submarine to be commissioned in the United States Navy in the years leading up to the country's December 1941 entry into World War II. She was the sixth ship of the United States Navy to be named for Grampus griseus, also known as Risso's dolphin, a member of the dolphin family Delphinidae. Her World War II  service was in the Pacific Ocean. She completed five war patrols in the following 14 months, and is credited with sinking over 45,000 tons of Japanese merchant shipping and warships. She was declared lost with all hands in March 1943; of the twelve Tambor-class submarines, only five survived the war. She received three battle stars for her World War II service.

Construction and commissioning
Grampus′s keel was laid down by the Electric Boat Company of Groton, Connecticut. She was launched on 23 December 1940, sponsored by Mrs. Clark H. Woodward, and commissioned on 23 May 1941 at New London, Connecticut.

Operational history

Pacific

The Japanese attack on Pearl Harbor found Grampus undergoing post-shakedown overhaul at Portsmouth, New Hampshire, but soon ready for war on 22 December, she sailed for the Pacific, reaching Pearl Harbor on 1 February 1942, via the Panama Canal and Mare Island.

On her first war patrol from 8 February to 4 April 1942, Grampus sank an 8636-ton tanker Kaijo Maru No.2 4 March 1942, the only kill of her short career, and reconnoitered Kwajalein and Wotje atolls, later the scene of bloody but successful landings. Grampus second patrol en route to Fremantle, Australia, and her third patrol from that base were marred by a heavy number of antisubmarine patrol craft off Truk Lagoon and poor visibility as heavy rains haunted her path along the Luzon and Mindoro coasts.

Taking aboard four coast watchers, Grampus sailed from Fremantle on 2 October 1942 for her fourth war patrol. Despite the presence of Japanese destroyers, she landed the coast watchers on Vella Lavella and Choiseul islands while conducting her patrol. This patrol, during the height of the Guadalcanal campaign, took Grampus into waters teeming with Japanese men-of-war. She sighted a total of four enemy cruisers and 79 destroyers in five different convoys. Although she conducted a series of aggressive attacks on the Japanese ships, receiving 104 depth charges for her work, Grampus was not credited with sinking any ships. On 18 October 1942 Grampus even scored a direct hit on the Yura, but the torpedo failed to explode. She returned to Australia on 23 November.

Grampus''' fifth war patrol, from 14 December 1942 to 19 January 1943, took her across access lanes frequented by Japanese submarines and other ships. Air and water patrol in this area was extremely heavy and although she conducted several daring attacks on the 41 contacts she sighted, Grampus again was denied a kill.

Sinking

In company with Grayback, Grampus departed Brisbane on 11 February 1943 for her sixth war patrol, from which she failed to return; the manner of her loss still remains a mystery. Japanese seaplanes reported sinking a submarine on 18 February in Grampus patrol area, but Grayback reported seeing Grampus in that same area 4 March. On 19 February the Grampus is believed to have damaged the "Keiyo Maru" [6442 GRT] and 27 February 1943 also damaged the IJN Minesweeper W.22. On 5 March 1943, the Japanese destroyers  and Murasame conducted an attack preceding the Battle of Blackett Strait, near Kolombangara island. A heavy oil slick was sighted there the following day, indicating that Grampus may have been lost there in a night attack or gun battle against the destroyers. The Japanese destroyers had by then already been sunk in a night action with U.S. cruisers and destroyers.

When repeated attempts failed to contact Grampus'', the submarine was declared missing and presumed lost with all hands. Her name was struck from the Naval Vessel Register on 21 June 1943.

See also
 John R. Craig

References

Further reading

External links 
On Eternal Patrol: USS Grampus

Tambor-class submarines
World War II submarines of the United States
Lost submarines of the United States
Missing submarines of World War II
Ships built in Groton, Connecticut
1940 ships
Ships lost with all hands
Maritime incidents in March 1943
Submarines sunk by Japanese warships